In the 1948–49 season, USM Blida is competing in the Division Honneur for the 16th season French colonial era, as well as the Forconi Cup. They will be competing in Division Honneur, and the North African Cup.

Friendly

Competitions

Overview

Division Honneur

League table

Matches

Forconi Cup

Squad statistics

Playing statistics

Goalscorers
Includes all competitive matches. The list is sorted alphabetically by surname when total goals are equal.

Transfers

In

Out

References

External links

USM Blida seasons
Algerian football clubs 1948–49 season